Çetmi is a village in the Gümüşhacıköy District, Amasya Province, Turkey. Its population is 491 (2021).

References

Villages in Gümüşhacıköy District